Dmitry Anatolyevich Khubezov (born December 20, 1971, Ryazan) is a Russian political figure and deputy of the 8th State Duma. In 1995, he was granted a Doctor of Sciences in Medicine degree. 

After graduating from the Ryazan State Medical University in 1995, Khubezov started working at the Regional Clinical Hospital. In 2017, he was appointed the head of the hospital. In 2020, he was elected deputy of the  Ryazan Oblast Duma of the 7th convocation. Since September 2021, he has served as deputy of the 8th State Duma from the Ryazan Oblast constituency. In October 2021, he was appointed Head of the State Duma Committee on Health Protection.

References

1971 births
Living people
United Russia politicians
21st-century Russian politicians
Eighth convocation members of the State Duma (Russian Federation)
People from Ryazan